Bang O is a khwaeng (subdistrict) of Bang Phlat District, in Bangkok, Thailand. In 2020, it had a total population of 24,225 people.

References

Subdistricts of Bangkok
Bang Phlat district